was a specialized medical facility located in the town of Futsukaichi (present day-Chikushino, Fukuoka), Japan, set up in 1946 by the Ministry of Welfare after World War II. It operated for 1.5 years and performed abortions before they were legalized in 1947, and treated sexually transmitted diseases (STDs, such as syphilis or gonorrhea) in rape survivors who were repatriated from China or Korea.

Futsukaichi clinic, or Futsuka’ichi Sanatorium are some of its other designations in English.

Background
After the end of World War II, Japanese citizens who had migrated to occupied areas had to return to mainland Japan. During the repatriation from China or Korea, they were vulnerable to violence, exposure, and malnutrition.

One of the pioneers at organizing medical help for these refugees was anthropologist , who is sometimes credited with being the actual figure who later created the Repatriate Aid Society's , the people who operated the Futsukaichi clinic.

In the immediate postwar Korea, he organized a network of mobile medical teams to help Japanese refugee in transit from Seoul to Busan. The teams were also posted at major entry ports for repatriates in Japan. And it had been sanctioned by the Allied troops. This MRU is considered the precursor to the kyūryō bu medical corp that later manned the Futsukaichi clinic.

The  ("Busan Relief Society", "Busan Homeland Japanese Support Organization", etc.,) and the MRU have been conducting surveys on the medically examined women refugees since December 1945. The figures for March 1946 showed that out of the 885 women surveyed, roughly 10 percent had been sexually assaulted (70 rape survivors and 19 STD-infected individuals). Izumi was aware of the scale of problem he would be faced with.

Establishment
The Futsukaichi clinic was started by a group of doctors at Japanese imperial university in Seoul and activists who after returning to Japan wanted to assist the refugees, with the help of a semi-governmental Repatriate Aid Society aligned with the Japanese foreign ministry.

The staff of the former Keijō Imperial University School of Medicine in Seoul had been treating Japanese refugees stranded in Korea, but most were back in Japan by December 1945, and wished to continue their services by treating the displaced repatriates. As end-result, the Seoul Group became integrated as the Society's medical corp.

The Seoul Group, now known as the Repatriate Aid Society's "medical corp", dispatched physicians to the repatriation ships. The ship doctors observed that most of the evacuees were those who fled Northern Korea, and particularly the girls and women were in miserable states; many had been violated during their flight, and as a result had contracted sexually transmitted diseases or had become pregnant, with no measures in place for providing relief. With cooperation from both the Relief Aid Society and the center, the Futsukaichi Rest Home was opened March 25, 1946.

The facility was located in Futsukaichi, a quiet and secluded hot-spring area near Hakata port in Fukuoka, where the largest number of repatriates arrived. The building was converted from the Musashi Hot Springs Rest House once owned by the prefectural chapter of the ". It was a wooden, two-storey building with 14 or 15 units available as patient's rooms on the second floor.

Two doctors and ten nurses (including three midwives) from the Repatriate Aid Society staffed it. Similar facilities were placed at the Kyushu Imperial University School of Medicine, National Fukuoka Sanatorium, Kurume Medical School, National Saga Sanatorium, and Nakahara Army Sanatorium in Saga Prefecture.

Facility operation

One of the major issues faced by the society was how to make the facility known to the victims. The society handed out flyers in repatriation ships, but carefully selected their wording. The flyer said: "To the unfortunate Women your urgent attention! If by unlawaful violence or threat you have been bodily injured.. and your body is feeling abnormalities.. then we will admit you to the clinic and return you to your home country with sound body, so please contact the ship's physician". For women who had already returned to Japan, the group placed advertisement with similar circumloquacious text in influential newspapers.

The Ministry of Health and Welfare issued verbal orders to its workers that all women disembarking at Hakata port were to be screened for pregnancy.

During the facility's one-and-a-half year working period, the medical team carried out an estimated 400–500 abortions.

Because of the shortage of medication, patients sometimes had to accept operations without anesthesia that was potentially lethal. The rest house operated until fall 1947, just before the Japanese government passed an amendment to the Eugenic Protection Act 1948 which allowed abortions in cases of rape or on eugenics grounds.

See also
Repatriation
So Far from the Bamboo Grove

Explanatory notes

References
Citations

Bibliography

 (Reprint) 

 (Published by: Tokai Foundation of Gender Studies)

 (approximate)

Medical and health organizations based in Japan